Peru is an extinct town in Bates County, in the U.S. state of Missouri.

A post office called Peru was established in 1892, and remained in operation until 1901. The community's name may be a transfer from Peru in South America.

References

Ghost towns in Missouri
Former populated places in Bates County, Missouri